Qərsələ (also, Garsele and Gersala) is a village in the Ismailli Rayon of Azerbaijan.  The village forms part of the municipality of Birinci Yeniyol.

References 

Populated places in Ismayilli District